CGST may refer to:

 China Graduate School of Theology
 Chinese Giant Solar Telescope
 Central Goods and Services Tax